"Come Closer" is a 1964 song and single by Dee Clark, written by Bob Gaudio of the Four Seasons. The single was one of Clark's career bests, and broke him into Chicago and other soul markets, but failed to impact on white audiences. The female vocal trio Jessica James and the Outlaws covered the song the next year on the B-side of their "Give Her Up Baby".

Clark's song lyrics begin "I never met a girl like you..", while Jessica James' lyrics begin "Never met a guy like you." The refrain "Come come come closer, come closer to me" is the same in both versions.

References

1964 songs
Songs written by Bob Gaudio